Celle is a village of Vernio in the Italian region of Tuscany. From the village it is possible to observe the Bisenzio valley and the villages of Cavarzano San Quirico d'Orcia.

Gallery

External links

Frazioni of the Province of Prato